Mirko Poledica (Serbian Cyrillic: Мирко Поледица; born 11 September 1978) is a Serbian retired professional footballer and the current President of the Syndicate of Professional Footballers in Serbia.

Career
Born in Čačak, as a child he loved sports, and started playing football in his hometown club Borac Čačak when he was 10 years. He passed by all the youth squads and had excellent coaches like Milovan Ćirković, Mića Kovačević and Mihailo Kolarević. The last one, took him to the senior squad, making him debut against the giant Red Star. The list of his co-players that were in the youth teams of Borac was one of the best in the club's history, and includes names like Milivoje Vitakić, Ivica Dragutinović, Branko Jelić, Neško Milovanović, among others. After four seasons in the senior team, he moves to one of the greatest Serbian clubs, Vojvodina where, in the 2001-02 season, was chosen by the First League managers to the ideal 11 of the league and is crowned as the best assistant. In that season he also receives a call to the Serbia national team in a friendly match against Mexico, but did not get to play. The second half of the 2002-03 season, played, on loan, at the Polish club Lech Poznań. His great exhibitions did not passed unnoticed and many clubs disputed over him, winning at the end, the Czech champions Sparta Prague. He played one season there helping the team to reach the last 16 in the Champions League and winning the national Cup. Next, he returns to Polish football, this time to play in the capitals Legia Warsaw. The first season there he finishes only third in the league, but in the second year his team wins the championship in a spectacular nack-a-nack finish with Wisla. Because of some financial issues he leaves the club and returns to Serbia after five years abroad signing with Smederevo where had played all the club's matches until the end of the season. In summer 2007 signs with another Superliga club Čukarički, and, since January 2008, plays back in his hometown club Borac Čačak. In summer 2009 he moved to the First League club Mladost Lučani where he played his last season before retiring.

On 12 March 2009, he was elected as President of the Syndicate of Professional Footballers in Serbia. and has been dedicating himself to defend the rights of all footballers throughout Serbia.

Honours
Sparta Praha
Czech Cup: 2003–04
Legia Warsaw
Ekstraklasa: 2005–06

References

External links
 Mirko Poledica official website
 

Living people
1978 births
Sportspeople from Čačak
Serbian footballers
FK Borac Čačak players
FK Vojvodina players
Lech Poznań players
Expatriate footballers in Poland
Serbian expatriate sportspeople in Poland
AC Sparta Prague players
Czech First League players
Expatriate footballers in the Czech Republic
Legia Warsaw players
Ekstraklasa players
FK Smederevo players
FK Čukarički players
Serbian SuperLiga players
FK Mladost Lučani players
Association football defenders
Serbian expatriate sportspeople in Bulgaria